Clarke Petterson (born August 23, 1997) is a Canadian professional lacrosse player with the Cannons LC of the Premier Lacrosse League and the Halifax Thunderbirds of the NLL. He attended The Hill Academy in Ontario, Canada, and played collegiate lacrosse at Cornell University.

College career 
Petterson was an Honorable Mention All-Ivy in 2017, second-team All-Ivy in 2019, and a USILA All-American in 2019. At Cornell, he was a three-time team captain and was the first sophomore captain in the history of the men’s lacrosse program in 2017. Petterson finished in the top 10 at Cornell for career goals and points and during the 2019 season was ranked second in the nation in shooting percentage (.557), 17th in goals per game (2.93), and 28th in points per game (4.13). During the course of his collegiate career he moved from defensive midfield, to offensive midfield, to attack.

Professional career 
With the 5th overall pick in the 2019 Premier Lacrosse League Draft, Petterson was selected by the Redwoods Lacrosse Club. Petterson was also selected by the Boston Cannons with the 12th overall pick in the 2019 Major League Lacrosse draft. He made his first professional start with Redwoods on Sunday, June 2 in a win against the Atlas Lacrosse Club. Petterson was also the 5th overall pick in the 2020 NLL Entry Draft. His first professional indoor lacrosse appearance came on December 21, 2019 with the Thunderbirds. In this first game against the Rochester Knighthawks, Petterson scored a hat trick and was named player of the game.

Petterson was selected by Cannons Lacrosse Club in the PLL Expansion Draft ahead of the 2021 season.

Statistics

NLL

PLL

NCAA

References

1997 births
Living people
Canadian expatriate lacrosse people in the United States
Canadian lacrosse players
Cornell Big Red men's lacrosse players
Halifax Thunderbirds players
Lacrosse forwards
Premier Lacrosse League players
Competitors at the 2022 World Games
World Games gold medalists